Browning is a town in Taylor County, Wisconsin, United States. The population was 850 at the 2000 census. The unincorporated community of Gad is located in the town.

Geography
According to the United States Census Bureau, the town has a total area of 36.5 square miles (94.6 km2), of which, 36.5 square miles (94.5 km2) of it is land and 0.03% is water.

History
The south and east edges of the six by six mile square that would become Browning were first surveyed in 1851 by crews working for the U.S. government. In the fall of 1861 a different crew of surveyors marked all the section corners in the township, walking through the woods and swamps, measuring with chain and compass. When done, the deputy surveyor filed this general description:
The Surface of this Township is generally level or gently rolling. Soil is principally 2nd Rate Timber Hemlock Birch Sugar White Pine Spruce and Fir and it is well watered by numerous Small Streams of pure water.

Demographics
As of the census of 2000, there were 850 people, 298 households, and 246 families residing in the town. The population density was 23.3 people per square mile (9.0/km2). There were 313 housing units at an average density of 8.6 per square mile (3.3/km2). The racial makeup of the town was 98.47% White, 0.12% Asian, 1.18% from other races, and 0.24% from two or more races. Hispanic or Latino of any race were 2.59% of the population.

There were 298 households, out of which 40.9% had children under the age of 18 living with them, 71.8% were married couples living together, 5.0% had a female householder with no husband present, and 17.4% were non-families. 12.1% of all households were made up of individuals, and 4.4% had someone living alone who was 65 years of age or older. The average household size was 2.85 and the average family size was 3.10.

In the town, the population was spread out, with 28.9% under the age of 18, 8.7% from 18 to 24, 32.8% from 25 to 44, 20.9% from 45 to 64, and 8.6% who were 65 years of age or older. The median age was 35 years. For every 100 females, there were 115.7 males. For every 100 females age 18 and over, there were 108.3 males.

The median income for a household in the town was $45,917, and the median income for a family was $46,833. Males had a median income of $28,950 versus $21,250 for females. The per capita income for the town was $18,687. About 4.6% of families and 5.9% of the population were below the poverty line, including 7.8% of those under age 18 and 7.5% of those age 65 or over.

See also
 List of towns in Wisconsin

References

External links

Towns in Taylor County, Wisconsin
Towns in Wisconsin